Beverly Miles is a nurse and retired U.S. Army Major. She ran for Governor for the Democratic party in Illinois against incumbent J.B. Pritzker in 2022. She was one of the nine Black women who ran for governor in 2022.

Early life and career 
Miles was born in Clarksdale, Mississippi. She was raised and resides in the West Garfield Community on the west side of Chicago, where she attend public school and considered herself an "at-risk youth". She attended Chamberlain College of Nursing where she received a Master of Science in Nursing Family Nurse Practitioner and Master of Science in Nursing, Informatics, Indiana Wesleyan University where she received a Bachelor of Science in Nursing, and Kennedy King College where she received an Associate of Science in Nursing. In 1999, She entered the U.S. Army as a second lieutenant and retired in 2014 with the rank of Major. After, she continued her nursing career. She has a double master's in prepared registered nursing and more than 20 years of experience. She has also been active in her community. She has participated in volunteering and mentoring.

Political career 
She first became involved in politics through community service and activism. In 2019, she ran for the 28th Ward Alderman in Chicago, Illinois, and lost. Miles is involved with advocacy efforts in her Chicago community. She was appointed to the City of Chicago's Advisory Committee on Veteran Affairs in 2020 for a three-year unpaid term. Miles has had multiple grassroots campaigns, most of which have been funded by her own bank account.

2022 gubernatorial midterm election 
Miles ran as a Democrat for governor in the Illinois 2022 gubernatorial midterm election. She ran a grassroots campaign with minimal funding or news coverage. If for no other reason, she stated that a “billionaire who let down the Black community during his first term shouldn't run unopposed.” Multiple attempts were made to remove her from the ballot, including campaign finance complaints and other suits to make her candidacy illegitimate, but all failed.

She won 8.2% of votes losing to incumbent J.B. Pritzker. Despite her lack of campaigning, she obtained more than 32,000 votes in Cook County and 9,356 in Chicago. Miles won at least 10 percent of Democratic primary votes in a dozen Chicago wards. She also received more votes in Chicago than prominent Republican nominees. Miles beat Republican nominee Darren Bailey's 14,769 Chicago vote total and bested Aurora Mayor Richard Irvin by nearly threefold.

Controversy ensued during the primary race as somebody tried to get her removed from the ballot and fired from her job at the Hines Veterans Administration Hospital. This was due to the Hatch Act - a 1937 law prohibiting certain federal employees from participating in partisan politics. Her intention to run for partisan office as a federal employee violated this act, meaning she had to quit her job or drop out. Miles fought the case and speculated that Pritzker's campaign was to blame. Miles had to spend thousands of dollars on legal fees and two lawyers to protect her job and remain on the ballot. The People Who Play by the Rules PAC sponsored a TV ad with Miles claiming Pritzker tried to get her fired. Pritzker and his team denied the claims and labeled the ads false and defamatory. Lawsuit threats caused media companies to request edits to the ad from the PAC.

Political issues 
Miles has a humanistic and healthcare perspective on most issues. Regarding LGBTQ+, she believes we should follow the lead of those in the community. She also believes we need to continue to focus on addressing HIV/AIDS. Whatever needs to be done to “keep people happy and healthy.” She believes we should look to healthcare workers and experts in addressing COVID-19. She wants Illinois funding to focus on marginalized communities. She believes we need to re-evaluate funding in our criminal justice system and support citizens financially, psychologically, and educationally to reduce crime rates. She believes in supporting businesses and entrepreneurs to bring job growth, population growth, and prevent an increase in taxes. She also believes we need to financially assist and educate Illinois residents to provide relief due to inflation and high property taxes. As a veteran and nurse she believes we need to help victims of trauma to help the homelessness and mental health crises. People need more access to care. Other key issues of her platform include, medicare for all, reparations for descendants of slaves, and decreasing gun violence. She is pro-abortion rights, but does not support it as a form of "repeated birth control". She believes she can rebuild trust between the government and Illinois citizens.

References 

Wikipedia Student Program
African-American women
Living people
Year of birth missing (living people)

Illinois Democrats